Andrés Carranza Guerra (born May 31, 1963) is a Mexican football manager and former player.

References

External links

1963 births
Living people
Association football defenders
Club Puebla players
Santos Laguna footballers
Liga MX players
Mexican football managers
Sportspeople from Monterrey
Footballers from Nuevo León
Mexican footballers